Luigi Capuana (May 28, 1839 – November 29, 1915) was an Italian author and journalist and one of the most important members of the verist movement (see also verismo (literature)). He was a contemporary of Giovanni Verga, both having been born in the province of Catania within a year of each other. He was also one of the first Italian authors influenced by the works of Émile Zola, French author and creator of naturalism. Capuana also wrote poetry in Sicilian, of which an example appears below.

He was the author of plays (Garibaldi, Vanitas Vanitatum, Parodie, Semiritmi), stories (Studi sulla letteratura contemporanea, Per l'arte, Gli "ismi" contemporanei, Cronache letterarie, Il teatro italiano contemporaneo), novels (Giacinta, Marchese di Roccaverdina, La sfinge, Giovanna Guglicucci: o le pareti del labirinto, Profumo, Rassegnazione) and various other theatrical works.

Biography

Origins and schooling
Luigi Capuana was born in Mineo, in the Province of Catania. His family was wealthy, and owned property in the area. He attended the local school.
In 1851 he enrolled in the Royal College of Bronte, Catania, but left after only 2 years because of bad health. However, he continued to study by teaching himself.
After graduating he enrolled in the Faculty of Law at Catania in 1857. He abandoned this in 1860 in order to take part in Garibaldi's Risorgimento as the secretary of the Secret Committee of Insurrection in Mineo, and later as the chancellor of the nascent civic council.

"Literary Adventures"

In 1861 Capuana released the legendary drama Garibaldi in three cantos, published in Catania by Galatola. In 1864 he settled in Florence to begin his "literary adventure": he met, and kept in touch with, the most notable Italian authors of the era (including Aleardo Aleardi); he published his first critical essays in the "Italian Review" in 1865; he became the theatre critic for "Nation" in 1866; he published, serially in a Florentine daily in 1867, his first novella, entitled Dr. Cymbalus which took Dumas fils' La boîte d'argent as a model.  He would stay in Florence until 1868.

Return to Sicily

In 1868 Capuana returned to Sicily planning a brief stay, but his father's death and economic hardship anchored him to the island.
He worked as a school inspector and later as counselor of Mineo until he was elected as mayor of the town.

During these years he learned more about Hegel's idealist philosophy.  He was especially inspired by "Dopo la Laurea", an essay by positivist and Hegelian doctor Angelo Camillo De Meis, who had developed a theory on the evolution and death of literary genres.

Catania: work at university and death
In 1902 Capuana moved to Catania to lecture lexicography and stylistics at the local university.

His last literary works included "Coscienze" (1905), "Nel paese di Zàgara" (1910), and "Gli Americani di Rabbato" (1912).

Capuana died in Catania on November 29, 1915, shortly after Italy entered the First World War.

Example of his poetry in Sicilian

Sta notti... (Tonight)

References

 Arba Sicula, Vol. 2, 1980 (source of both the poem in Sicilian and the English translation).

External links
 
 
 
 Capuana's works: text with concordances and frequency list
 Text Frequencies of "Profumo"
 Answers.com article on Luigi Capuana
 Ecco una fiaba musicale illustrata un po' speciale di Luigi Capuana, che chiunque abbia un dispositivo android (e-book reader, telefonino, tablets,...) può scaricare gratuitamente... Di seguito il link: https://play.google.com/store/apps/details?id=org.t15.gradiccioli.titirititi&hl=it

1839 births
1915 deaths
People from Mineo
Kingdom of the Two Sicilies people
Writers from Sicily
Journalists from Sicily
Italian male journalists